Twentieth Century Steam Riding Gallery No. 409, also known as Schenevus Carousel, is a historic carousel located at Schenevus in Otsego County, New York. The carousel and its pavilion were built in 1908.  The carousel is housed in a wooden, 16-sided, enclosed pavilion supported in wooden poles and topped by a wooden roof covered with asphalt shingles.  The carousel has 24 horses, four chariots, and 16 folding benches.  The steam riding gallery type is characterized by horses that rock back and forth, rather than move up and down.  It was constructed by the Herschell-Spillman Co.

It was listed on the National Register of Historic Places in 1998.

References

Carousels on the National Register of Historic Places in New York (state)
Amusement rides introduced in 1908
Buildings and structures in Otsego County, New York
Buildings and structures completed in 1908
National Register of Historic Places in Otsego County, New York
1908 establishments in New York (state)